Clashmore is a scattered township in Assynt, in Sutherland, in the Highland council area of Scotland. It is situated on the Rubha Stoer, 10 km north west of Lochinver, overlooking the Loch na Claise.

References

Populated places in Sutherland